Lacinipolia lepidula is a species of cutworm or dart moth in the family Noctuidae. It is found in North America.

The MONA or Hodges number for Lacinipolia lepidula is 10401.

References

Further reading

 
 
 
 

Eriopygini
Articles created by Qbugbot
Moths described in 1888